Sarosa mora is a moth in the subfamily Arctiinae. It was described by Schaus in 1911. It is found in Costa Rica, Panama and Nicaragua.

References

Natural History Museum Lepidoptera generic names catalog

Moths described in 1911
Arctiinae
Arctiinae of South America